Siqueiros is a Spanish surname. Notable people with the surname include:

 Alejandro Siqueiros (born 1982), Mexican freestyle swimmer
 David Alfaro Siqueiros (1896–1974), Mexican painter
 Leobardo Siqueiros (born 1994), Mexican footballer

Spanish-language surnames